Ab Kaneh (also Romanized as Āb Kaneh, Abkaneh, Ābkaneh, and Āb Keneh; also known as Āb Ganeh and Ab Gineh) is a village in Bala Deh Rural District, Beyram District, Larestan County, Fars Province, Iran. At the 2006 census, its population was 799, in 143 families.

References 

Populated places in Larestan County